Rääkkylä (Swedish also ) is a municipality of Finland. It is located in the province of Eastern Finland and is part of the North Karelia region. The municipality is unilingually Finnish.

The municipality has previously also been known as "Bräkylä" in Swedish documents, but is today referred to as "Rääkkylä" also in Swedish.

Rääkkylä as an independent municipality was established in 1874 from parts of Kitee and Liperi. Neighbouring municipalities are Joensuu, Kitee, Liperi, Savonlinna and Tohmajärvi.

Leading Finnish kantele manufacturer Koistinen Kantele has been functioning in Rääkkylä since 1995.

People
Actor Esa Pakarinen (1911–1989), better known for his role as Pekka Puupää
Author Raimo J. Kinnunen (born 1931)
Mari and Sari Kaasinen, founders of the popular Finnish folk music band Värttinä.

References

External links

Municipality of Rääkkylä – Official website 
 Koistinen Kantele

 
Populated places established in 1874
1874 establishments in Finland